Chirsova is a commune and village in the Gagauz Autonomous Territorial Unit of the Republic of Moldova.  The 2004 census listed the commune as having a population of 6,861 people.   Gagauz total 3,128, Bulgarians - 3,326. Minorities included 156 Moldovans, 119 Russians, 98 Ukrainians,  1 Romanian, 9 Roma and 24 'other nationality'.

Its geographical coordinates are 46° 14' 2" North, 28° 38' 53" East.

References

Chirsova
Bulgarian communities in Moldova